Soulfire may refer to:
 Soulfire (comics), a comic book
 Soulfire (Christafari album), 1995
 Soulfire (Tom Hingley album), 2000
 Soulfire (Little Steven album), 2017
 Soul-Fire, a 1925 silent drama
 Soul of the Fire, the fifth novel in the Sword of Truth series